Fuzzy logic is a form of logic theory.

Fuzzy Logic may also refer to:

 Fuzzy Logic (Super Furry Animals album)
 Fuzzy Logic (David Benoit album)
 "Buttercrush / Fuzzy Logic", an episode of The Powerpuff Girls

See also
 Fuzzy Logic Recordings, a Canadian independent record label